Rifle bedding is a process of providing a rigid and consistent foundation for a rifle’s operational components, by creating a stable and close-fitting bearing surface between the gun’s functional parts (i.e. the receiver housing the barrelled action) and its support part (i.e. the stock) that do not deform with pressure or shift under the shear stress of the recoil from firing.  This is for the goal of accurizing the rifle and (to a lesser extent) prolonging the life of the stock. The bedding process is often an aftermarket improvement.

Purpose

Increasing accuracy
Bedding increases accuracy in part by relieving stress on the action. The rifle's action will rarely sit flush in the stock without bedding. This causes the action to flex when tightening the bolts holding the action to the stock. This flexing results in inconsistency during operation, which accumulates to a loss of accuracy over time.  Bedding will create a flush surface for the action and prevent flexing.  Bedding also reduces movement of the action in the stock.  Without bedding, the action may be more likely to shift after a shot.  If the action shifts and does not return to same spot in the stock the rifle will lose the ability to maintain zero.

Prolonging stock life
Bedding can help prolong the life of the stock. Repeated recoil forces can cause movement of the action in the stock.  As the action moves, friction can create wear in the stock surface. Eventually the repeated wear can ruin the stock.

Methods
Bedding involves molding an epoxy-based material onto the stock recess to fill away the gaps within its contact surface with the receiver (known as glass bedding), and/or inserting a metal cylinders (which act as compression members) around the action screws to reduce compressive shifting (known as pillar bedding).  The receiver and the stock are sometimes fastened indirectly through an intermediate piece (usually made of rigid materials such as aluminium alloy) known as a bedding block, which multifunctionally serves as a larger pillar, a bedding surface and even recoil lugs.  The contact interface on the stock may also be substituted by a metallic bedding frame known as a chassis, which is either embedded within the stock, or even completely replacing the stock like the lower receiver on many modern modular semi-automatic rifles.

Skim bedding refers to an adjustment of a glass bedding job, usually after wear and tear from use, which consists of removing a small layer of the bedding material — usually up to around  — and adding new bedding material on top of that.

Several different bedding methods can be used depending on the type of stock, desired results and level of experience of the person attempting to perform the bedding. Methods include:
 Full contact bedding of the action with the barrel floated.
 Full contact bedding of the action and the barrel.
 Full contact bedding of the action with a pressure-bearing pad for the barrel.
 Pillar bedding of the action with the barrel floated.
 Full length aluminum action bedding block.

Full contact bedding of the action with the barrel floated is a very common method for long range rifles with a heavy barrel.  A free-floating barrel will generally produce the greatest accuracy. However, a pressure pad under the barrel just forward of the action can sometimes improve accuracy by acting on barrel harmonics and reducing stress on the action from the weight of the barrel. Pillar bedding can be used to float the action as well as the barrel, but the process is more difficult.

Precautions
If performed improperly, bedding can destroy a rifle. Mechanical locking occurs when bedding material is allowed to harden in holes or around protrusions on the action. If locking occurs, the action can be permanently fixed to the stock. Extreme measures may have to be taken to separate the stock from the action, possibly destroying one or both. Improperly applied or insufficient release agent can cause the bedding material to bind to the metal. If the trigger assembly is not removed prior to bedding, epoxy can seep into the trigger assembly and ruin it.

References

Further reading

Firearm components